Heinz Günthardt and Peter McNamara were the defending champions but only McNamara competed that year with Paul McNamee.

McNamara and McNamee lost in the first round to Rolf Gehring and Ángel Giménez.

Sherwood Stewart and Ferdi Taygan won in the final 6–2, 7–6(7–3) against Pablo Arraya and Eric Fromm.

Seeds
Champion seeds are indicated in bold text while text in italics indicates the round in which those seeds were eliminated.

Draw

Final

Top half

Bottom half

External links
 1982 Volvo International Doubles draw

Doubles